Hesse-Darmstadt (German: Hessen-Darmstadt) may refer to:
 Landgraviate of Hesse-Darmstadt (Landgrafschaft Hessen-Darmstadt) (1567–1806), a state of the Holy Roman Empire
 Grand Duchy of Hesse (Großherzogtum Hessen) (1806–1918), formed after the dissolution of the Holy Roman Empire, and later member of the German Confederation and the German Empire
 People's State of Hesse (Volksstaat Hessen) (1918–1945), created after the abolition of the German monarchies following the revolutions of 1918–1919, a state of Germany during the time of the Weimar Republic